Eddie Mills (born December 30, 1972) is an American actor. He played Vandy in the TV drama Wasteland.

Filmography

External links
 

Living people
1972 births
American male film actors
American male television actors